Richard John Hyde (July 4, 1936 – July 15, 2019), sometimes credited as Slyde Hyde, was an American trombonist who played several brass and woodwind instruments. He was a member of the National Academy of Recording Arts and Sciences (NARAS) Hall of Fame. He worked as a session musician and sideman for Count Basie,  Herbie Hancock, Frank Sinatra, Jaco Pastorius, Steely Dan, Earth, Wind & Fire,  The Beach Boys, Tom Waits, Supertramp, Temptations, Boz Scaggs, Ringo Starr, Carole King, Madonna, and Donna Summer.

Biography and career
Hyde was born Richard John in Lansing, the capital of the U.S. state of Michigan, on 4 July, 1936.  He began his trombone studies in fourth grade when he  was living in Bluffton, Indiana and later in Los Angeles, California. He lived (in 2013) with his wife Yolanda (Yolee) of 42 years in Hawi, Hawaii.  Hyde continued his studies first at the Los Angeles City College and then at the Navy School of Music, which at the time was located at the Naval Receiving Station of Anacostia, on the Anacostia River in Maryland.  He served and toured with the United States Navy Band, based at the historic Washington Navy Yard in Washington, D.C., where he met saxophonist Jay Migliori, who helped him to take the first steps towards his professional career.

Hyde made his recording debut on the 1960 big band vocal album, Two Much!, with Ann Richards singing backed by Stan Kenton and his Orchestra.  Since then he has toured and recorded hundreds of albums with rock, pop, jazz artists, including Ralph Marterie, Count Basie, Woody Herman, Harry James (1960–1961), Roger Wagner Orchestra and Chorale (1966), Carole King (1973), Jaco Pastorius (1982–1983), Frank Sinatra (1987–1989).  He has recorded with jazz big bands and artists such as Henry Mancini, Bill Conti, Allyn Ferguson, Johnny Mandel, Freddie Hubbard, Herbie Hancock, Thelma Houston, Cannonball Adderley, Tom Scott, folk artists like Rita Coolidge and Kris Kristofferson, and popular music acts such as Neil Diamond, Donna Summer, The Pointer Sisters, The Beach Boys, Helen Reddy, Earth, Wind & Fire, Supertramp, Madonna among many others.

Recipient of four NARAS MVP awards in 1974, 1984, 1986, and 1988 respectively, and MVP Emeritus, his style is strongly influenced by American trombonists J. J. Johnson and Carl Fontana.

Awards
Hyde is a four-time NARAS (National Academy of Recording Arts and Sciences, also known as The Recording Academy) MVP (Most Valuable Player) winner and MVP Emeritus in the NARAS Hall of Fame.  He won the award for Best Trombone Player in 1974, for Best Tuba Player in 1984, for Best Bass Trombone Player in 1986, and for Best Double Brassist Player in 1988.

Discography

Studio albums

Live albums

Compilation albums

Soundtracks

References

External links

1936 births
American horn players
American multi-instrumentalists
American session musicians
American trombonists
Male trombonists
American trumpeters
American male trumpeters
American tubists
Living people
Musicians from Lansing, Michigan
21st-century tubists
21st-century American male musicians